Formula 5000 (or F5000) was an open wheel, single seater auto-racing formula that ran in different series in various regions around the world from 1968 to 1982. It was originally intended as a low-cost series aimed at open-wheel racing cars that no longer fit into any particular formula. The '5000' denomination comes from the maximum 5.0 litre engine capacity allowed in the cars, although many cars ran with smaller engines. Manufacturers included McLaren, Eagle, March, Lola, Lotus, Elfin, Matich and Chevron.

In its declining years in North America Formula 5000 was modified into a closed wheel, but still single-seat sports car racing category.

F5000 around the world

North America

Formula 5000 was introduced in 1968 as a class within SCCA Formula A races, a series where single seaters from different origins were allowed to compete, but which rapidly came to be dominated by the cars equipped with production-based American V8s. The concept was inspired by the success of the Can-Am Series, which featured unlimited formula sports cars fitted with very powerful engines derived from American V8s; the idea was to replicate the concept using open wheel racing cars. F5000 enjoyed popularity in the early 1970s in the U.S. and featured drivers such as Mario Andretti, Al Unser, Bobby Unser, James Hunt, Jody Scheckter, Brian Redman, David Hobbs, Tony Adamowicz, Sam Posey, Ian Ashley, John Cannon and Eppie Wietzes.

Increasing costs and Lola domination meant the formula quickly lost its appeal after 1975. Older cars continued to be used in the SCCA national races, but the most competitive teams reconverted their cars with sports car bodyworks, in the resurrected Can-Am championship, starting in 1977. The formula worked initially, with a number of European drivers crossing the Atlantic to attend the SCCA-run championship, but when IMSA introduced the new GTP prototype regulations for the IMSA GT Championship in 1981, the old F5000 were now clumsy and slow compared to the new cars.

Europe

In the UK, the arrival of the Cosworth DFV engine meant that many teams could now afford to build their own chassis around a good engine/transmission package, so Cooper, Lotus and Brabham stopped the production of customer Formula 1 cars. Unfortunately, smaller privateer teams and drivers that entered Britain's non-championship F1 events were left behind, and the RAC quickly adopted the American F5000 regulations.

A European championship was first run in 1969 as the Guards Formula 5000 Championship. This was renamed to Guards European Formula 5000 Championship in 1970, to Rothmans European Formula 5000 Championship in 1971 and then to ShellSport European Formula 5000 Championship in 1975.

Unlike the American series, the European championship didn't attract many star names from Formula 1 and sports cars, and was dominated by drivers that were usually seen in Formula 2 or at the back of F1's World Championship grids. Peter Gethin managed to launch his F1 career thanks to his F5000 championship titles. While it was based in the United Kingdom, the series managed to spread across Europe, with races held at many international circuits, including Monza (Italy), Hockenheim (Germany) and Zandvoort (Netherlands), and attracted a significant number of continental drivers.

The weak pound (a result of the energy crisis) and the increasing cost of importing Chevrolet V8 engines caused some concern and engine regulations for European F5000 were revised to permit engines other than the 5.0 litre pushrod V8s - the DOHC Cosworth GA V6 (based on a unit used in Group 2 Capris was permitted to race at a capacity of 3500cc. March 75A and Chevron B30 cars were successful with the V6, the March in particular being little more than a 751 Formula One car with minor modifications for the new engine.

However, the same problem that befell US F5000 happened in Europe, and in 1976 the European F5000 Championship evolved into the Shellsport Group 8 Championship. This was a British-based series for Formula 1, Formula 2, Formula 5000 and Formula Atlantic cars, forming the basis of what would become the Aurora F1 Championship in 1978. The F1 Championship was open to Formula 1 and Formula 2 cars only, with Formula 5000 cars no longer eligible.

Older F5000 cars continued to be used in the British Sprint Championship and were common in Formula Libre races well into the 1980s.

Australia and New Zealand

In Australia and New Zealand, the Tasman Formula, defining cars eligible for the annual Tasman Series, was extended in 1970 to include Formula 5000 cars as well as the existing 2.5 litre cars. The Tasman Series ran during the Formula One off season in the European winter, and in the 1960s it had attracted the attention of the greatest names in Grand Prix racing, from locals Jack Brabham, Denny Hulme, Bruce McLaren and Chris Amon, to foreigners like Graham Hill, Jim Clark, Jackie Stewart, Phil Hill, Piers Courage and Jochen Rindt.

However, by the 1970s Formula One had become more commercial and the Grand Prix stars no longer took part. The Tasman Series had become a competitive Australian/New Zealand local championship leaving the field to be dominated by the cream of "Down Under" drivers such as Frank Matich, Frank Gardner, Kevin Bartlett, Vern Schuppan, Graeme McRae, Graeme Lawrence, Warwick Brown, Johnnie Walker, John McCormack, Alan Jones, John Goss, Larry Perkins, John Bowe and Garrie Cooper racing against European and American drivers such as David Hobbs, Teddy Pilette, Mike Hailwood, Sam Posey, Richard Attwood and Peter Gethin. The four Australian Formula 5000 Tasman races continued (separate from the New Zealand races) as the Rothmans International Series from 1976 until 1979.

Formula 5000 was also the main component of Australian Formula 1 from 1971 to 1981 and this formula was the primary category contesting the Australian Drivers' Championship during those years and the Australian Grand Prix until 1980. Although still called Australian Formula 1 until 1983, F5000 was replaced by Formula Pacific and Formula Mondial after 1981.

While European cars such as the various Lolas, McLarens and Chevrons were popular, locally made cars from Matich (Matich A50, A51, A52 and A53), Elfin (Elfin MR5, MR6, MR8 and the MR9, the only ground effects F5000 ever built) and McRae were also successful. The most popular engine used was the 5.0 L Chevrolet V8, with the Australian made Repco Holden, based on the 5.0 L Holden V8 engine, also popular and successful.

Formula 5000 remains a popular historic category in Australia and New Zealand with the Tasman Revival Series running races in both countries.

The S5000 Australian Drivers' Championship is marketed as a modern interpretation of Formula 5000, featuring a modern European-built open wheeler chassis fitted with a large-capacity V8 engine.

South Africa 
The South African Formula One Championship was opened to Formula 5000 cars in 1968, with these racing against Formula One and Formula Two cars until the series switched to Formula Atlantic from 1976 onwards.

Revival as historic racing category

The category was revived in the late 2000s in New Zealand as an amateur historic racing category.  In 2009/2010, a five round race series was held, the final round as a support race for the 2010 Australian Grand Prix in Melbourne, Australia.

The annual Wine Country Classic, a historic automobile racing event held at Infineon Raceway in Sonoma, California, had a tribute to Formula 5000 in 2008. At that time, the Wine Country Classic was a 
sister event to the popular Monterey Historic Automobile Races held at Mazda Raceway Laguna Seca in Monterey, California.

In 2014, the Rolex Monterey Reunion featured Formula 5000 cars as a featured race to conclude the weekend and the 2015 get together included Formula 5000 cars as well.

List of F5000 Champions

Notes

1971 SCCA Formula A Champion was Dave Heinz of Tampa, Florida in a Lola 142/Traco Chevy. The SCCA Runoffs were run at Road Atlanta that year.

References

External links

OldRacingCars.com F5000 cars histories and race results
NZ Formula 5000 Association website - runs a historic racing series for original F5000 cars.
Formula 5000 history f5000aust.com
Formula Thunder 5000 youtube.com

 
5000
5000